Carles Tena Parra (born 15 October 1992) is a Spanish professional footballer who currently plays as a midfielder for Hong Kong Premier League club Resources Capital.

Career statistics

Club

Notes

References

Living people
1992 births
Spanish footballers
Spanish expatriate footballers
Association football midfielders
Hong Kong Premier League players
Tercera División players
CE Europa footballers
UE Figueres footballers
Resources Capital FC players
Spanish expatriate sportspeople in Hong Kong
Expatriate footballers in Hong Kong